Sentry is a fictional character appearing in American comic books published by Marvel Comics. The character was created by Stan Lee and Jack Kirby in July 1967. It is one of series of giant humanoid robots called Kree Sentries built by the Kree. The Sentry has also appeared in animated adaptations.

Publication history

The Kree Sentries first appeared in Fantastic Four #64 (July 1967) and were created by Stan Lee and Jack Kirby.

Fictional character biography

Sentry-459
The Sentries' main purpose is to stand guard over military outposts and depots throughout the Kree Empire. Sentry-459 accompanied a Kree scientific party that journeyed to Earth to experiment on sub-humans (which in turn created the race the Inhumans). When the Kree left Earth, Sentry-459 remained to monitor Inhuman progress, so that the Kree could later use them as a militia force. Sentry-459 remained inert but observing until activated by the superheroes the Fantastic Four, who fought it to a standstill. Considering itself defeated when the Fantastic Four escaped, the Sentry sent a signal to the Kree alerting them to the presence of meta-humans on Earth and then deactivated itself (the Kree Ronan the Accuser investigates the signal and battles the Fantastic Four soon after).

The Sentry was then transported by the U.S. Army to Cape Canaveral, where it was reactivated by the Kree Colonel Yon-Rogg, the leader of the Kree expedition then investigating Earth. Yon-Rogg hoped the Sentry would kill the hero Captain Marvel, another member of expedition. Mar-Vell, however, managed to defeat it.

Ronan the Accuser later reactivated the Sentry and used it in an attempt to reverse the course of evolution on Earth, but it was once again defeated by Mar-Vell. The Kree agents attempt to retrieve the Sentry but are driven off by spy agency S.H.I.E.L.D. The Sentry was seen again when activated by the Super-Adaptoid, who used the robot as part of his team Heavy Metal in a bid to destroy the superhero team the Avengers. It returned in the Blackwulf series, having been found by Ultron, and joins the Underground Legion but was eventually destroyed in the series finale.

Other Kree Sentries
Sentry-459 is not the only Kree Sentry of the Kree Empire. The following are also Kree Sentries:

Sentry-9168
Another Sentry - designated 9168 - was encountered by the Fantastic Four on the Moon. Only six feet tall, this Sentry was programmed to prevent any space travelers from Earth from finding the remains of a hidden Kree city in the Blue Area of the Moon. The Fantastic Four battle and destroy the Sentry via a remote destruct mechanism.

Sentry-213
It was destroyed by a group of Eternals led by Uranos, sparking a war with the Kree.

Sentry-372
This Sentry only appears once, and battles several members of the Shi'ar Imperial Guard before being damaged by the West Coast Avengers. The Sentry then self-destructs and destroys the outpost it was guarding.

Sentry-571
This version aided the Kree when their "Lunatic Legion" attacked Earth. It was defeated by Iron Man.

Powers and abilities 
Being a robot created by the Kree, the Sentry has Super Strength and durability, Magnetism and Energy Projection

In other media

Television
 Sentry-459 appears in the Fantastic Four episode "The Sentry Sinister", voiced by Mark Hamill.
 The Kree Sentries appear in the Fantastic Four: World's Greatest Heroes episode "Trial by Fire".
 Sentry-459 appears in The Avengers: Earth's Mightiest Heroes episode "459". It was sent to Earth to eliminate anything that could threaten the Kree empire.
 The Kree Sentries appear in the Avengers Assemble episodes "Captain Marvel" and "Westland".

Video games
 A Kree Sentry appears as an assist character in Avengers in Galactic Storm.
 Kree Sentries appear in Marvel: Avengers Alliance Tactics.
 A Kree Sentry appears in Marvel: Avengers Alliance 2.
 Sentry-459 appears in Lego Marvel Super Heroes 2. After Maximus forms an alliance with the Kree, he uses one of their Sentries to guard Attilan's Royal Palace before Black Bolt and Medusa fight it to get inside. In a bonus mission, Morgan le Fay summons Sentry-459 to help her defeat King Arthur and Merlin, but it is defeated.
 A Kree Sentry appears in Marvel's Avengers. Buried underneath San Francisco Bay, the Avengers unknowingly begin to unearth it due to their new Helicarrier's Terrigen crystal power source until Captain America destroys the Helicarrier. Five years later, MODOK activates and merges with the Sentry to kill the Avengers, only to be defeated by Kamala Khan. Following the battle, the Sentry launches a beacon into space.

References

External links
 
 
 

Characters created by Jack Kirby
Characters created by Stan Lee
Comics characters introduced in 1967
Marvel Comics characters with superhuman strength
Marvel Comics robots
Marvel Comics supervillains